Katiana Levavasseur (born 9 December 1970) is a French politician of the National Rally and is a Member of the National Assembly for Eure's 2nd constituency. She was elected during the 2022 French legislative election and defeated outgoing deputy Fabien Gouttefarde.

Levavasseur worked as a cleaner and a maintenance technician at an E.Leclerc supermarket. During her campaign, she stated that she wanted to defend "the employment of France's unskilled workers." A profile by France 24 noted that Levavasseur's election (along with other newly elected deputies such as Rachel Keke) indicated a growing trend of elected politicians from lower economic backgrounds taking up office.

She is a municipal councilor of Neubourg.

References

1970 births
Living people
National Rally (France) politicians
Deputies of the 16th National Assembly of the French Fifth Republic
Women members of the National Assembly (France)
Politicians from Rouen
Members of Parliament for Eure